Gifts & Messages is an album by jazz multi-instrumentalist Roland Kirk. It was originally released on the Mercury label in 1964 and features performances by Kirk with Horace Parlan, Michael Fleming, and Steve Ellington.

Track listing
''All compositions by Roland Kirk except where noted.
 "The Things I Love" (Lew Harris, Harold Barlow) - 3:12
 "Petite Fleur" (Sidney Bechet) - 3:10
 "March On, Swan Lake" (Pyotr Ilyich Tchaikovsky arranged by Roland Kirk) - 3:57
 "Tears Sent By You" (Michael Fleming) - 5:59
 "My Heart At Thy Sweet Voice" (Camille Saint-Saëns arranged by Roland Kirk) - 3:21
 "Gifts And Messages" - 4:06
 "Hip Chops" - 3:33
 "Blues For C & T" - 3:06
 "Where Does The Blame Lie" - 2:49
 "Vertigo Ro" - 4:07
Recorded in Los Angeles, CA on July 22, 1964

Personnel
Roland Kirk: tenor saxophone, manzello, stritch, flute, siren
Horace Parlan: piano
: bass
Steve Ellington: drums

References

1964 albums
Mercury Records albums
Rahsaan Roland Kirk albums